Friedrich Heinrich Ernst Graf von Wrangel (13 April 1784 – 2 November 1877) was a Generalfeldmarschall of the Prussian Army.

A Baltic German, he was nicknamed "Papa Wrangel" and was a member of the Baltic noble family of Wrangel.

Early life and career

Wrangel was born in Stettin (now Szczecin, Poland) in Pomerania into the Wrangel family. He was actually a relative uncle to the world-famous explorer Ferdinand von Wrangel. He entered a dragoon regiment in 1796 and became second lieutenant in 1798. He fought as a subaltern during the Napoleonic Wars, distinguishing himself especially at Heilsberg in 1807 and receiving the order Pour le Mérite. In the reorganization of the army, Wrangel became first lieutenant and then captain; won distinction and promotion to lieutenant-colonel in the War of Liberation in 1813; won the Iron Cross at Wachau, near Leipzig; and became colonel in 1815.

Wrangel commanded a cavalry brigade in 1821, and two years later, he was promoted to major-general. He commanded the 13th Division, with headquarters at Münster, in Westphalia, in 1834 during riots caused by differences between the Archbishop of Cologne and the Crown, and the determination and the resolution with which he treated the clerical party prevented serious trouble. He was promoted to lieutenant-general, received many honours from the court, enjoyed the confidence of the Junkers and commanded at Königsberg and then Stettin.

First Schleswig War
In 1848, Wrangel commanded the II Corps of the army of the German Confederation during the First Schleswig War, was promoted to General of Cavalry and won several battles. However, the other European powers pressured Prussia to withdraw its forces, and King Frederick William IV accordingly ordered Wrangel to withdraw his troops from the duchies. Wrangel refused by asserting that he was under the command of not the king of Prussia but the regent of Germany. He proposed that at the very least, any treaty concluded should be presented for ratification to the Frankfurt Parliament, which was dominated by the liberals, which gave Liberals the rather mistaken idea that Wrangel was on their side. However, the Danes rejected that proposal, and negotiations were broken off, and after painful hesitation, Prussia signed a convention at Malmö that yielded to practically all of the Danish demands on 26 August 1848.

German Revolutions
Wrangel's insubordination was not counted against him when, in the autumn, he was summoned to Berlin to suppress its riots during the German revolutions of 1848–49. As governor of Berlin and commander-in-chief of Brandenburg (appointments that he held until his death), he proclaimed a state of siege and ejected the Liberal president and the members of the Chamber. Thus, on two occasions in the troubled history of Prussia's revival, Wrangel's uncompromising sternness achieved its object without bloodshed.

Second Schleswig War
From then on, Wrangel was most prominent in connection with the revival of the Prussian cavalry from the neglect and inefficiency into which it had fallen during the years of peace and poverty since 1815. In 1856, after 60 years of service, he was made a field marshal. At the age of 80, he commanded the Austro-Prussian army in the Second Schleswig War with Denmark in 1864. Wrangel was too old for active work and often issued vague or impracticable orders; he had always desired the young "Red Prince", Prince Frederick Charles of Prussia, to have the command. However, the prestige of Wrangel's name and the leadership of Frederick Charles, Helmuth von Moltke the Elder, Eduard Vogel von Falckenstein and Ludwig von Gablenz made the campaign an overwhelming success.

Later life
After the Battle of Dybbøl, Wrangel resigned his command, was created a Graf (count), and received other honours. In 1866, "Papa" Wrangel assisted in the Austro-Prussian War but without a command on account of his great age. He took a keen interest in the second reorganisation of the cavalry army in 1866 to 1870, and in the Franco-Prussian War in 1870 to 1871. He died in Berlin in 1877.

Legacy
On the 70th anniversary of his joining the army, Wrangel's regiment, the 3rd Cuirassiers, was given the title Graf Wrangel. A noteworthy Commander of this regiment was the Swedish Count Gilbert Hamilton who led the regiment during World War I.

Honours
He received the following orders and decorations:

References

External links 
Porträt: Ehrenbürger Friedrich von Wrangel 
Berlin-Lexikon 

1784 births
1877 deaths
Military personnel from Szczecin
People from the Province of Pomerania
Field marshals of Prussia
Counts of Germany
German military personnel of the Napoleonic Wars
Prussian military personnel of the Second Schleswig War
Prussian people of the Austro-Prussian War
German military personnel of the Franco-Prussian War
Recipients of the Iron Cross (1813)
Recipients of the Iron Cross, 1st class
Recipients of the Pour le Mérite (military class)
Grand Crosses of the Order of the Dannebrog
Recipients of the Military Merit Cross (Mecklenburg-Schwerin), 1st class
Grand Crosses of the Order of Saint Stephen of Hungary
Commanders Cross of the Military Order of Maria Theresa
Recipients of the Order of St. Vladimir, 4th class
Friedrich